Raajakumara is a 2017 Indian Kannada-language action drama film written and directed by Santhosh Ananddram and produced by Vijay Kiragandur under Hombale Films. It stars Puneeth Rajkumar and Priya Anand. Ananth Nag, Sarath Kumar, Prakash Raj, Chikkanna, Sadhu Kokila, Achyuth Kumar and Avinash play supporting roles. The film's music album was composed by V. Harikrishna. 

The film was released on 24 March 2017 and received positive reviews from critics and audience where the film went to become sixth highest-grossing Kannada film at the time of its release until K.G.F: Chapter 1 surpassed it. This film was dubbed into Hindi as Daring Raajakumara. The film became the first Kannada movie to complete 6000 shows in multiplex within six weeks of its release. The film also completed 7577 shows in multiplex within 87 days. The film had a theatrical run of more than one hundred days in 45–50 centres across Karnataka. The gross collections of the movie was reported to be .

Plot
Siddharth is the adopted son of Ashok, who is a kind-hearted corporate businessman and Sujatha. He leads a happy life in Melbourne, Australia taking care of his father's business and fighting for his native country's pride. He is also a helpful youngster, who helps anyone in need. Siddharth falls for Nandini, a salsa instructor and also Ashok's friend Jagadeesh's daughter. Siddharth's life takes a tragic turn as he loses his whole family in a flight crash and returns to India to his orphanage headed by Krishna, which is now an old-age home. Through Jagadeesh, He discovers that Ashok was framed for the deaths of infant children due to the polio scheme introduced by Ashok for the poor people, where he decide to prove Ashok's innocence. He also looks after the old people in an old age home, like their son and solves all their problems, while also taking care of the children, purchasing medicines to the children affected by the polio scheme.

One day, Siddharth comes across Vishwa Joshi in the hospital, who also stays in the  old-age home. Vishwa Joshi reveals that the Polio scheme was actually ruined due to the machinations created by his son Jagannath, who is the present-health minister of Karnataka. He wants to expose the illegal acts done by Jagannath and was hiding in the old-age home for the right time to expose him. Siddharth also supports Vishwa Joshi and makes Jagannath to hand over the case to CBI for further investigation in an interview. Jagannath tries to ruin their plans and tries to get the old age home and even gets his father attacked by his henchmen. However, Jagannath has a change of heart where he saves his father and surrenders himself to the police and all the old people reunite with their children, after learning of their mistakes from Siddharth, who gave a speech at an interview.

Cast

 Puneeth Rajkumar as Siddharth aka Appu, adopted son of Ashok and Sujatha
 Priya Anand as Nandini, a salsa instructor, Siddharth's love interest and fiancée
 Ananth Nag as Vishwa Joshi, Jagannath's father
 Sarath Kumar as Ashok, adoptive father of Siddharth
 Prakash Raj as Jagannath, a corrupt politician
 Chikkanna as Chikka, Ashram's Cook
 Sadhu Kokila as Anthony Gonsalves, a guide at Goa
 Achyuth Kumar as Krishna, Ashram's head
 Honnavalli Krishna as Muniyappa
 Bhargavi Narayan as Puttamma
 Chitra Shenoy as Gayathri
 Anil as Suri, Jagannath's assistant
 Vijayalakshmi Singh as Sujatha, adoptive mother of Siddharth
 Rangayana Raghu as Venky, Siddharth's uncle, he is fun-loving
 Dattanna as Mohammad Rafi
 Avinash as Jagadeesh, Nandini's father
 Ashok as Murthy
 Dany Kuttappa as Financier
 M P Venkatarao
 Aruna Balraj
 Rockline Sudhakar
 Ravi Hegde
 Sundar Ram
 Goutham Karanth
 Bank Suresh
 Malathi Sudhakar
 Ashok Dev
 Veena Sundar
 Vijay Koundinya as Corrupt police inspector
 M. K. Mata as Thangam
 Mandeep Roy
 Vijayanand as Press photographer
 K. S. Shridhar
 Jani Master in a cameo appearance "Appu Dance"

Production

Development

In March 2016, it was reported that Director Santhosh Ananddram and Puneeth Rajkumar would work together for the first time together. V. Harikrishna was selected to compose the music for this film. The film was highly expected due to its marketing. "Rajakumara is a different subject which portrays two different stories & the two stories are bridged between Appu's character", said Santhosh. Pre-production work, location hunt and casting finalisation required almost a year.

Casting
Priya Anand was roped to play lead actress role which marked her debut in Kannada cinema, collaboration with Puneeth Rajkumar. The film has an ensemble cast starring Ananth Nag, Prakash Raj, Sarath Kumar, Achyuth Rao, Chikkanna, Datthanna, Sadhu Kokila, Rangayana Raghu and others.

Filming
The film went on the floors on 22 April 2016. The first schedule took place in Australia in various parts like Brisbane, Gold Coast, Sydney and Melbourne after which the crew did the rest of the shoot in Bengaluru, Chennai, Mysuru, Goa, Varanasi and later in Malaysia. The makers of his upcoming film, Raajakumara released the first look of the film on 17 March — to coincide with the actor's 41st birthday.

Soundtrack

V. Harikrishna composed the soundtrack album and background score for the film. The full album was released on 6 March 2017. The song "Bombe Helutaithe" samples the beat of the song "Aadisi Nodi Beelisi Nodu" from the film Kasturi Nivasa.

Critical reception
The film got positive reviews upon the theatrical release from both critics and the audience. Sunayana Suresh from Times Of India rated it 4/5 and stated that "The entire ensemble cast, right from comedians Rangayana Raghu and Achyuth Kumar to antagonist Prakash Raj and veterans like Ananth Nag, HG Dattatreya and Bhargavi Narayan have interesting characters sketched out that entertain you."

Indiaglitz rated it 4/5 writing, "This is a good family watch; the youths think on their mistakes, the oldies get relief, fans of Puneeth Rajakumar thoroughly enjoy." Shashiprasad SM of Deccan Chronicle rated the film 3/5 stars and stated that "If family sentiment is your preferred mode of entertainment, then ‘Raajakumara’ will not disappoint you."

The writer Archana Nathan of The Hindu described the film as generic, writing "There is very little that gives Raajakumara its identity or a clear storyline ... Achyuth Kumar and Ananth Nag perform well but their roles too are too simplistically written." Shyam Prasad of Bangalore Mirror rated the film 3/5 stars and stated that "The constant reference to Puneeth’s career and films goes overboard at times. The film becomes a tribute to the actor and a personality building exercise mostly. But he manages to pull off the role with the subtlety that proves his acting prowess again."

Box office
The film released in over 350 screens across Karnataka, collected ₹75 crore  and went on to become highest grossing Kannada film of all time until the release of K.G.F: Chapter 1.

Awards

References

External links
 

2017 films
2010s Kannada-language films
2017 romantic comedy-drama films
2010s action comedy-drama films
Films scored by V. Harikrishna
Films shot in Mysore
Films shot in Bangalore
Films shot in Uttar Pradesh
Films shot at Ramoji Film City
2010s masala films
Indian action comedy-drama films
Indian romantic comedy-drama films
Films set in Karnataka
Films shot in Sydney
Films set in Sydney
Films shot in Goa
Films set in Goa
Films shot in Brisbane
Films shot in Melbourne
Political action films
Films about corruption in India
Films directed by Santhosh Ananddram